Oregon Route 233 is an Oregon state highway which runs between the cities of Amity and Dayton, USA, in the Willamette Valley.

Route description
OR 233 begins at an intersection with Oregon Route 99W in Amity.  It heads northeast from there, passing through Willamette Valley farmland, ending at an intersection with Oregon Route 18 between Dayton and McMinnville.  The highway then heads east (through Dayton), concurrent with OR 18, before both highways terminate at an intersection with OR 99W just west of Dundee.

OR 233 comprises part of the Salmon River Highway No. 39 (see Oregon highways and routes), part of the Lafayette Highway No. 154, and the Amity-Dayton Highway No. 155.  The concurrency with OR 18 comprises the Salmon River Highway section.

Major intersections

References

External links

ORoads: Oregon Highway 18 (has info on OR 233)

233
Transportation in Yamhill County, Oregon